Ağca  is a surname. Notable people with the surname include:

 Elif Ağca (born 1984), Turkish volleyball player
 Mehmet Ali Ağca (born 1958), Turkish assassin who shot and wounded Pope John Paul II on May 13, 1981
 Rohat Agca (born 2001), Dutch footballer

Turkish-language surnames